The Kwatkwat were an indigenous Australian tribe of the State of Victoria, though some scholars consider them part of the broader Yorta Yorta/Pangerang macrogroup.

Country
The strip included the junction of the King and Ovens rivers.

Alternative names
 Quart-Quart
 Emu Mudjug tribe.(?)
 Pikkolatpan

Some words
 pikor (emu).

Notes

Citations

Sources

Aboriginal peoples of Victoria (Australia)
History of Victoria (Australia)